This article provides a list of scientific, nationwide public opinion polls that were conducted relating to the 1936 United States presidential election.

Presidential election

Franklin Roosevelt vs Alf Landon vs William Lemke vs Norman Thomas

Polling for the Republican Presidential Nomination

References

1936 United States presidential election